Alain Chabaud (13 March 1923 – 11 March 2013) was a French parasitologist, mainly a specialist of nematodes and sporozoa. He was the Director of the Laboratoire de Zoologie (Vers) in the Muséum National d'Histoire Naturelle in Paris from 1960 to 1989. He was one of the founders of the Société Française de Parasitologie in 1962 and its president until 1975, and president of the Société zoologique de France in 1967.

Taxa named in his honour 

Chabaud's name is honoured in many parasite taxa described by his colleagues. The most famous species named in the honour of Chabaud is Plasmodium chabaudi Landau, 1965, a species studied in many laboratories.

Several genera of Nematoda were named in the honour of Chabaud, including Chabaudacuaria Mutafchiev & Kinsella, 2012, Chabaudechina Smales, 1999, Chabaudgolvania Freitas, 1958 (also honouring French parasitologist Jean-Yves Golvan). Chabaudus chabaudi Inglis & Ogden, 1965 has both genus and species names honouring Chabaud.

Many species of Nematoda were named in the honour of Chabaud and include: Africana chabaudi Baker, 1981, Angiostrongylus chabaudi Biocca, 1957, Aonchotheca chabaudi (Justine, 1989) Pisanu & Bain, 1999, Aspiculuris (Paraspiculuris) chabaudi Gupta & Trivedi, 1986, Atractis chabaudi Petter, 1966, Brygoonema chabaudi (Schmidt 1965), Cardiofilaria chabaudi Dissanaike & Fernando, 1965, Cephaluris chabaudi Inglis, 1959, Chromaspirina chabaudi Boucher, 1975, Cooperia chabaudi Diaouré, 1964, Cucullanus chabaudi Le-Van-Hoa & Pham-Ngoc-Khue, 1967, Cyathospirura chabaudi Gupta & Pande, 1981, Cyrnea (Procyrnea) chabaudi Rasheed, 1965, Dioctowittus chabaudi Bain & Ghadirian, 1967, Dujardinascaris chabaudi Diaz-Ungria and Gallardo, 1968, Enterobius chabaudi Kalia & Gupta, 1982, Falcaustra chabaudi Dyer, 1973, Gendrespirura chabaudi Le Van Hoa, 1962, Geopetitia chabaudi Rasheed, 1960, Gyrinicola chabaudi Araujo & de Toledo Artigas, 1983, Habronema chabaudi Ali, 1961, Hassalstrongylus chabaudi Diaw, 1976, Heligmonina chabaudi Desset, 1964, Longistriata chabaudi Desset, 1964, Maxvachonia chabaudi Mawson, 1972, Metacyatholaimus chabaudi Gourbault, 1980, Metathelazia chabaudi Singh & Pande, 1966, Molineus chabaudi Schmidt, 1965, Nematodirus chabaudi Rossi, 1983, Oswaldocruzia chabaudi Ben Slimane & Durette-Desset, 1996, Oswaldofilaria chabaudi Pereira, Souza Lima & Bain, 2010, Oxyspirura (Oxyspirura) chabaudi Baruš, 1965, Paraheligmonina chabaudi Kouyaté, 1981, Pelecitus chabaudi Bartlett & Greiner, 1986, Pelodera chabaudi Crusz & Santiapillai 1982, Protospirura chabaudi Vuylsteke, 1964, Psyllotylenchus chabaudi Deunff & Launay, 1984, Rhabdochona chabaudi Mawson, 1956, Schneidernema chabaudi Quentin, 1966, Sciadiocara chabaudi Schmidt & Kinsella, 1972, Sphaerocephalum chabaudi Inglis, 1962, Spirocamallanus chabaudi  Gupta & Garg, 1986, Stewartia chabaudi  Rao, 1989, Tachygonetria chabaudi Hering-Hagenbeck, 2001, Vexillata chabaudi Yoyette Vado, 1972, and Vogeloides chabaudi (Singh & Pande 1956).

In addition, species from other phyla include Acanthocephala such as Breizacanthus chabaudi Golvan, 1969 and Centrorhynchus chabaudi Golvan, 1958; Digenea such as Carmyerius chabaudi van Strydonck, 1970, Clinostomum chabaudi Vercammen-Grandjean, 1960, Microphallus chabaudi Capron, Deblock & Biguet, 1958, Neoapocreadium chabaudi Kohn & Fernandes, 1982, Opisthorchis chabaudi Bourgat & Kulo, 1977, Pseudosonsinotrema chabaudi (Caballero & Caballero, 1969) Sullivan, 1974; Cestoda such as Catenotaenia chabaudi Dollfus, 1953, Hemicatenotaenia chabaudi (Dollfus, 1953) and Oochoristica chabaudi Dollfus, 1954; Monogenea such as Diplectanum chabaudi Oliver, 1980 and Ligophorus chabaudi Euzet & Suriano, 1977; Oligochaeta such as Acanthodrilus chabaudi Jamieson & Bennett, 1979; Acari such as Amblyomma chabaudi Rageau, 1965, Brephosceles chabaudi Gaud, 1968 and Orthohalarachne chabaudi Gretillat, 1960; Fleas such as Ctenocephalides chabaudi Beaucournu & Bain, 1982; Phlebotomes such as Phlebotomus (Paraphlebotomus) chabaudi Croset, Abonnenc & Rioux; Parasitic Protozoa such as Hepatozoon chabaudi Brygoo, 1963, the Trypanosome Trypanosoma chabaudi Chandenier, Landau & Baccam, 1988, Nyctotheroides chabaudi Albaret, 1972 and the Gregarine Sphaerorhynchus chabaudi Tuzet & Theodorides, 1951. 

A species of snake, Liophidium chabaudi Domergue, 1984, was also named in honour of Chabaud.

Selected publications

References

External links

1923 births
2013 deaths
French microbiologists
French parasitologists
Recipients of the Legion of Honour
20th-century French scientists
National Museum of Natural History (France) people
Malariologists